Lawrence Peu (born 13 February 1966) is a South African long-distance runner. He competed in the men's marathon at the 1996 Summer Olympics.

References

1966 births
Living people
Athletes (track and field) at the 1996 Summer Olympics
South African male long-distance runners
South African male marathon runners
Olympic athletes of South Africa
World Athletics Championships athletes for South Africa
People from Boksburg
Sportspeople from Gauteng